Geophilus duponti is a species of centipede in the Geophilidae family. It is endemic to Australia, and was first described in 1897 by Italian entomologist Filippo Silvestri.

Description
The original description is based on a female specimen measuring 55 mm in length with 73 pairs of legs.

Distribution
The species occurs in eastern New South Wales. The type locality is Sydney.

Behaviour
The centipedes are solitary terrestrial predators that inhabit plant litter, soil and rotting wood.

References

 

 
duponti
Centipedes of Australia
Endemic fauna of Australia
Fauna of New South Wales
Animals described in 1897
Taxa named by Filippo Silvestri